The Fijian Latui is a professional rugby union team based in Suva that plays in the Global Rapid Rugby competition.

Officially launched in March 2019, the Latui played four Pacific Showcase matches during May and June 2019, before joining the inaugural Global Rapid Rugby tournament in 2020.

It was originally expected that the team would compete in 2019 for Rapid Rugby's A$1 million first prize, but the tournament launch was postponed for a year due to the shortened time frame following World Rugby approval in November 2018. The Showcase Series was arranged for 2019 instead.

Name
Latui, in Fijian, refers to the Fiji goshawk, a small hawk found in that country. The Latui can hunt its prey with either a stealthy glide or a rapid flapping attack.

Squad
The Latui team is drawn mainly from players based locally in Fiji. The squad for the 2020 season is:

Records

Season standings
Global Rapid Rugby

Notes:
 2019 Rapid Rugby matches in the Pacific showcase.

Head coaches
 Senirusi Seruvakula (2019–present)

Captains
 Mosese Voka (2019)
 Seru Vularika (2020)

See also

Rugby union in Fiji

References

External links
 Swire Shipping Fijian Latui player profiles
 FRU website
 Fijian Latui Rugby fan page

Fijian rugby union teams
Global Rapid Rugby teams
2019 establishments in Fiji
Rugby clubs established in 2019
Rugby union clubs disestablished in 2020
2020 disestablishments in Oceania